Ridgefield Veterans Memorial is a memorial in Ridgefield, Washington, commemorating locals who died in wars since the Spanish–American War. The memorial features five  columns, each topped with a flag representing one of the military service branches, was dedicated in November 2012. Approximately 250 people attended the dedication ceremony.

References

External links
 

2012 establishments in Washington (state)
Monuments and memorials in Washington (state)
Outdoor sculptures in Washington (state)
Ridgefield, Washington